The Gzhat is a river in Smolensk Oblast, Russia. It is 113 km long, with a drainage basin of 2370 km². It is a right tributary of the Vazuza. The town of Gagarin lies by the Gzhat.

References 

Rivers of Smolensk Oblast